Bowling at the 2014 Asian Games was held in Incheon, South Korea from September 23 to October 2, 2014.

Schedule

Medalists

Men

Women

Medal table

Participating nations
A total of 177 athletes from 19 nations competed in bowling at the 2014 Asian Games:

References

Results at ABF Website

External links
Bowling Site of 2014 Asian Games

 
2014 Asian Games events
2014
Asian Games
2014 Asian Games